Since opening in 1992, the Manchester Metrolink light-rail/tram system has grown to a network of 99 tram stops.

The system opened in April 1992 with 20 tram stops with routes radiating from Manchester Victoria to Bury and Manchester Piccadilly to Altrincham. Phase 2 extended the network to Eccles with 12 new tram stops and a new interchange at Cornbrook was built in 1999. Phase 3a involved the construction of 36 new stops and new lines to Rochdale via Oldham, Tameside and East Didsbury. The first stops as part of Phase 3a opened in 2011 and the final stop opened in 2014. A new  line to Manchester Airport became operational in November 2014 – 12 months ahead of schedule.

As of 2020, upon the completion of the Trafford Park Line, the Metrolink system has 99 stops. Primary future proposals include tram-trains to Bolton and Wigan and an extension from East Didsbury to Stockport.

List of Metrolink stops

Current stops
Correct as of 22 March 2020

Former stops

Fictional stops

Map

Future

Proposed
The proposed Manchester Airport High Speed station for the High Speed 2 extension to Manchester is expected to be connected to Manchester Airport by a newly constructed Wythenshawe Loop.

Buckley Wells, Elton Reservoir and Sandhills have been proposed as additional stops on the Bury Line, as well as Cop Road on the Oldham and Rochdale Line.

Cancelled

Some stops were planned along new lines but were eventually dropped.

Platforms

Metrolink tram stops have between one and four platforms, though most (91) have two platforms. Some are island platforms allowing easier transfers between services.

See also

List of fictional rapid transit stations

References

Manchester Metrolink tram stops
England transport-related lists